Sideroxylon montanum is a species of plant in the family Sapotaceae. It is endemic to Jamaica.  It is threatened by habitat loss.

References

Flora of Jamaica
montanum
Near threatened plants
Endemic flora of Jamaica
Taxonomy articles created by Polbot